Bulan was a Khazar king who led the conversion of the Khazars to Judaism. His name means "elk" or "hart" in Old Turkic. The date of his reign is unknown, as the date of the conversion is hotly disputed, though it is certain that Bulan reigned some time between the mid-8th and the mid-9th centuries. Nor is it settled whether Bulan was the Bek or the Khagan of the Khazars.

The renowned scholar D. M. Dunlop was certain that Bulan was a Khagan; however, more recent works, such as The Jews of Khazaria by business studies student and amateur researcher Kevin Brook, assume that he was the Bek due to references to him leading military campaigns. Khazar tradition held that before his own conversion, Bulan was religiously unaffiliated.  In his quest to discover which of the three Abrahamic religions would shape his own religious beliefs, he invited representatives from each to explain their fundamental tenets.  In the end, he chose Judaism.

In the Khazar Correspondence, King Joseph traces his lineage back to Bulan. He refers to the reforming Khazar ruler Obadiah as being one of "the sons of the sons of Bulan". While Brook assumes this makes Obadiah Bulan's grandson, the Hebrew phrase is less definitive and may allude to a more remote descent. The royal descendants of Bulan are referred to by Khazar researchers as Bulanids, though their self-designation is unknown.

The name Sabriel is given in the Schechter Letter (roughly contemporaneous with King Joseph's letter) for the Khazar king who led the conversion to Judaism. The Schechter Letter also gives Sabriel at least a partial Jewish/Israelite ancestry. Sabriel is described as having waged successful campaigns in the Caucasus and Iranian Azerbaijan, possibly as part of the Khazar-Arab wars.

His wife, Serakh, is described as a Jew and as encouraging him to study and adopt Judaism. The Schechter Letter is silent on the issue of whether Sabriel was Bulan; the name Bulan does not appear in that document.

Khazar scholars sometimes refer to the king who led the Khazar conversion to Judaism as "Bulan Sabriel", though it is conceivable that they may have been different people. In The History of the Jewish Khazars, for instance, D. M. Dunlop examined (and ultimately rejected) the theory of other scholars that Sabriel referred to Obadiah.

Stanford Mommaerts-Brown, a genealogist, historian and also a convert to Judaism, would point out that it is common for Jews, whether born among gentiles or converts, to have two names. One is of the nomenclature of the people among whom (s)he lives, (or was born), and a Hebrew name. Mr. Mommaerts-Brown's name is Yonathan Micah Hillel. 'Bulan' is clearly a Turkic name. After conversion he would have taken a Hebrew or Jewish name. 'Sabriel' looks very much to be a Turkic idiomatic variation of 'Gabriel'.

See also
Khazars
Khazar Correspondence
Yitzhak ha-Sangari

Sources
Kevin Alan Brook. The Jews of Khazaria. 2nd ed. Rowman & Littlefield Publishers, Inc, 2006.
Douglas M. Dunlop, The History of the Jewish Khazars, Princeton, N.J.: Princeton University Press, 1954.
Norman Golb and Omeljan Pritsak, Khazarian Hebrew Documents of the Tenth Century. Ithaca: Cornell Univ. Press, 1982.

Turkic rulers
Converts to Judaism from paganism
Khazar rulers
9th-century rulers in Europe
Jewish monarchs
8th-century Jews
9th-century Jews